Common-law relationship may refer to:

Common-law marriage
Common-law relationships in Manitoba
De facto relationship